Rauzan is a commune in the Gironde department in Nouvelle-Aquitaine in southwestern France. It contains the ruins of a castle, the Château de Rauzan, a tourist attraction.

Population

See also
Communes of the Gironde department

References

Communes of Gironde